Monique Mélinand (9 March 1916 – 16 May 2012) was a French film and television actress.

Selected filmography

 Rouletabille joue et gagne (1947)
 Rouletabille contre la dame de pique (1948)
 Between Eleven and Midnight (1949) - Irma
 Au royaume des cieux (1949) - Mademoiselle Guérande
 Lady Paname (1950) - Costa - l'accompagnatrice
 Old Boys of Saint-Loup (1950) - Hélène Laclaux
 The Drunkard (1953) - Denise Lamarche
 Blood to the Head (1956) - Marthe Cardinaud
 Women Are Weak (1959) - Mme Fenal, Julien's mother
 Magnificent Sinner (1959) - Tsarina Maria
 Vers l'extase (1960) - Mme Schultz
 The End of Belle (1961) - Mme. Monique Blanchon
 Rencontres (1962) - Inès
 La Bonne Soupe (1964) - La mère de Marie
 Angélique, Marquise des Anges (1964) - La Marquise du Plessis-Bellières (uncredited)
 The Great Spy Chase (1964) - Mme Lagneau (uncredited)
 The Thief of Paris (1967) - Mme de Montareuil
 L'horizon (1967) - La mère
 Delphine (1969) - La mère de Delphine
 The Scarlet Lady (1969) - Medium
 L'Américain (1969)
 Last Known Address (1970) - Mme Loring
 The Lady in the Car with Glasses and a Gun (1970) - Barmaid
 Mourir d'aimer (1971) - Madame Leguen
 Love Me Strangely (1971) - La voisine témoin
 Le cri du cormoran, le soir au-dessus des jonques (1971) - Une passante (uncredited)
 Léa l'hiver (1971) - La mère de Léa
 Les jambes en l'air (1971)
 L'homme au cerveau greffé (1971) - Elisabeth Marcilly
 Hellé (1972)
 A Slightly Pregnant Man (1973) - Mme Solanel
 Creezy (1974) - Simone
 The Mouth Agape (1974) - Monique, la mère
 Sept morts sur ordonnance (1975) - Mrs. Giret
 Les mal partis (1976) - La boulangère
 Body of My Enemy (1976) - Mme Mauve, la mère d'Hélène / Mrs. Mauve
 Solemn Communion (1977) - Julie Ternolain à 45 ans
 La machine (1977) - Le juge d'instruction
 Va voir maman, papa travaille (1978) - La mère d'Agnès
 Plurielles (1979) - La mère
 Us Two (1979) - La mère de Françoise
 Eclipse sur un ancien chemin vers Compostelle (1980)
 Cauchemar (1980) - Gelinotte
 They Call It an Accident (1982) - La mère de Gabriel
 On a volé Charlie Spencer! (1986) - La mère de la petite blonde
 Vent de galerne (1989) - Delphine
 Overseas (1990) - Tante Léonie
 Toubab Bi (1991) - Mamie Chapeau
 L'écrivain public (1993) - La dame
 Joan the Maid (1994) - Jeanne de Luxembourg
 Les frères Gravet (1996) - Annie Gravet
 Three Lives and Only One Death (1996) - Madame Vickers
 Transatlantique (1996) - Esther
 Genealogies of a Crime (1997) - Louise
 Time Regained (1999) - La grand-mère de Marcel
 Savage Souls (2001) - Thérèse âgée
 The Giraffe's Neck (2004) - Madeleine
 April in Love (2006) - Soeur Céleste
 Président (2006) - Mère président
 Avanti (2012) - Anita (final film role)

References

Bibliography
 Capua, Michelangelo. Anatole Litvak: The Life and Films. McFarland, 2015.

External links

1916 births
2012 deaths
French film actresses
French stage actresses
Actresses from Paris